Rosa Blanca (White Rose) is a 1961 Mexican film starring Ignacio López Tarso, based on a novel by B. Traven.

Plot
An illiterate Indian lives an idyllic existence as a landowner on Mexico's Gulf Coast until the greed of an American oil company gets in the way. He is murdered and the lives of all those around him are destroyed as the company takes over the land by crooked means.

External links

Mexican crime films
Films based on works by B. Traven
1960s crime films
1960s Mexican films
1970s Mexican films